The registered trademark symbol, is a typographic symbol that provides notice that the preceding word or symbol is a trademark or service mark that has been registered with a national trademark office. A trademark is a symbol, word, or words legally registered or established by use as representing a company, product or service.

Unregistered trademarks can instead be marked with the trademark symbol, while unregistered service marks are marked with the service mark symbol, . The proper manner to display these symbols is immediately following the mark; the symbol is commonly in superscript style, but that is not legally required. In many jurisdictions, only registered trademarks confer easily defended legal rights.

In the US, the registered trademark symbol was originally introduced in the Trademark Act of 1946.

Because the  symbol is not commonly available on typewriters (or ASCII), it was common to approximate it with the characters  (or ). An example of a legal equivalent is the phrase Registered, U.S. Patent and Trademark Office, which may be abbreviated to Reg U.S. Pat & TM Off. in the US.

Computer usage

Typing the character
 Canadian Multilingual Standard (CSA keyboard): 
 US international keyboard and UK extended keyboard layouts:  (subject to OS support).
 Microsoft Windows:  (on numeric keypad)
 Mac OS: 
 Linux: 
 Linux and ChromeOS:  then 
 HTML:  or 
 Emacs: 
 LaTeX: \textregistered in text mode. \circledR in text or math mode (requires amsfonts package)

Related and similar symbols
 The trademark symbol, ™, used for unregistered trademarks
 The service mark symbol, ℠, used for unregistered service marks
 The copyright symbol, ©
 The sound recording copyright symbol, ℗
 The Orthodox Union hechsher symbol, Ⓤ

See also
 World Intellectual Property Organization

Notes

References

External links

 The Comprehensive LaTeX Symbol List
 The U.S. Patent & Trademark Office

Trademark law
Typographical symbols